The Aghstafa (also, Aghstafachay) or Aghstev is a river in Armenia and Azerbaijan, and is a right tributary of the Kura. Along the river lie the cities of Dilijan, Ijevan, Gazakh and Aghstafa.

See also 
 List of lakes of Armenia
 Rivers and lakes in Azerbaijan
 Geography of Armenia
 Geography of Azerbaijan

References 

Rivers of Armenia
Rivers of Azerbaijan
International rivers of Europe
International rivers of Asia